The Southern Episcopal Church (SEC) is an American religious group, established in Nashville, Tennessee in 1953, and formally organised in 1962, in reaction to liberal political and theological trends within the Episcopal Church USA. It is connected to the Continuing Anglican movement, although it was formed more than a decade before the movement began.

The SEC does not consider itself a new denomination, but rather as providing a church home for Episcopalians who wished to maintain their Anglican faith and tradition. It uses the 1928 Book of Common Prayer for its liturgy.

The leader of the initial group was Burnice Hoyle Webster, a medical doctor who became presiding bishop. The current presiding bishop is William Martin Sloane.

The SEC has one seminary, the Holy Trinity College and Seminary, which offers classes by distance studies. All Saints, a parish church in Nashville, functions as the headquarters of the denomination.

References

External links
 Southern Episcopal Church website

Christian organizations established in 1962
Anglican denominations in North America
Protestantism in Tennessee
Continuing Anglican denominations
1962 establishments in Tennessee
Organizations based in Nashville, Tennessee
Conservatism in the United States
Anglican denominations established in the 20th century